Mikko Koivisto (born April 18, 1987) is a Finnish basketball player. He currently plays for Salon Vilpas of the Korisliiga and for the Finnish national basketball team. In high school at Holy Cross he won the VISSA (Virginia Independent Schools Althetes Association) division 3 state championship in 05. He started his professional career in 2003–04; later he played collegiate for the UNC Greensboro Spartans for four seasons. In 2010, he returned to professional basketball again.

Career
Koivisto signed with the Turkish team Royal Halı Gaziantep in February 2014.

Honours
Nilan Bisons
Korisliiga: 2011–12
Royal Halı Gaziantep
EuroChallenge Third Place: 2014

References

External links
UNC Greensboro profile

1987 births
Living people
Bisons Loimaa players
Finnish expatriate basketball people in Germany
Finnish expatriate basketball people in Turkey
Finnish expatriate basketball people in the United States
Finnish men's basketball players
Gaziantep Basketbol players
Kauhajoen Karhu players
Nilan Bisons players
Sportspeople from Vantaa
Shooting guards
Skyliners Frankfurt players
Sportspeople from Helsinki
Torpan Pojat players
UNC Greensboro Spartans men's basketball players
2014 FIBA Basketball World Cup players